Atlantic University College (AUC) is a private college in Guaynabo, Puerto Rico. It was founded in 1983 by Colonel Ramón M. Barquín. It is one of the only colleges or universities in the Caribbean specializing in digital arts education in all of its forms.

History 

Atlantic University College is a non-profit institution and is located in the heart of Guaynabo, facing the city's central plaza.

It is the first university founded in Guaynabo and is located in the city's historical district, which preserves the distinctive Spanish colonial-style architecture that characterized Puerto Rico's towns and cities in earlier times.

Atlantic University College was founded in response to Guaynabo's need for a local institution of higher education, as well as the growing demand for digital arts expertise in the commercial sector.

AUC's core programs were first offered in 1983 and now include a growing range of bachelor's and master's degree programs.

Administration 

AUC is a private institution of higher education operated by Atlantic University College, Inc., a non-profit corporation established under the laws of the Commonwealth of Puerto Rico and registered with the U.S. State Department.

Accreditation and licensing 
Atlantic University College authorized by the Puerto Rico Education Council and accredited by the Accrediting Commission of Career Schools and Colleges to award bachelor's, and master's degrees. AUC is also approved for students with educational benefits in the different G.I. Bill programs.

Memberships 

Atlantic University College is a member of the following associations:

 Hispanic Association of Colleges and Universities (HACU)
 Council for Higher Education Accreditation (CHEA)
 American Association of Hispanics in Higher Education (AAHHE)
 Association for Supervision and Curriculum Development (ASCD)
 Collaborative Institutional Training Initiative (CT Program)
 International Game Developers Association (IGDA)
 Printing Industries of America (PIA)
 Asociación Puertorriqueña de Investigación Institucional
 Puerto Rico Chamber of Commerce
 Puerto Rico Manufacturers Association
 Asociación de Educación Privada

Departments 

 General Education
 Business Administration
 Digital Cinematography Sciences
 Digital Graphic Design
 Digital Animation Sciences
 Video Game Art and Design Sciences
 Graduate Studies

References

External links
 Official website

1983 establishments in Puerto Rico
Educational institutions established in 1983
Private universities and colleges in the United States
Universities and colleges in Puerto Rico